The economy of Trinidad and Tobago is the third wealthiest in the Caribbean and the fifth-richest by GDP (PPP) per capita in the Americas. Trinidad and Tobago is recognised as a high-income economy by the World Bank. Unlike most of the English-speaking Caribbean, the country's economy is primarily industrial, with an emphasis on petroleum and petrochemicals. The country's wealth is attributed to its large reserves and exploitation of oil and natural gas.

Trinidad and Tobago has earned a reputation as an excellent investment site for international businesses and has one of the highest growth rates and per capita incomes in Latin America. Recent growth has been fueled by investments in liquefied natural gas (LNG) and petrochemicals. Additional petrochemical, aluminium, and plastics projects are in various stages of planning.

Trinidad and Tobago is the largest Caribbean producer of natural gas in CARICOM and the second largest producer of oil after Guyana, and its economy is heavily dependent upon these resources. It also supplies manufactured goods, notably food and beverages, as well as cement to the Caribbean region. Oil and gas account for about 40% of GDP and 80% of exports, but only 5% of employment.

Regional financial center
The country is also a regional financial center, and tourism is a growing sector, although it is not proportionately as important as in many other Caribbean islands. The economy benefits from a growing trade surplus. Economic growth reached 12.6% in 2006 and 5.5% in 2007 as prices for oil, petrochemicals, and LNG remained high, and as foreign direct investment continued to grow to support expanded capacity in the energy sector.

Trinidad and Tobago's infrastructure is adequate by regional standards. A major expansion of the Piarco International Airport in Trinidad, the country's main airport, was completed in 2001. There is an extensive network of paved roads, and utilities which are fairly reliable in the cities. Some areas, however, especially rural districts, still suffer from water shortages. The government is addressing this problem with the construction of additional desalinization plants. Infrastructure improvement, especially rural roads and telephone service, drainage, and sewerage, are among the government's budget priorities.

Communications and mobile

Trinidad and Tobago has a relatively modern, robust and reliable Information and Communications Technology (ICT) infrastructure. Mobile phone service is widespread and has been the major area of growth for several years. Digicel and Laqtel were granted cellular licenses in 2005, breaking the monopoly of the sole provider of mobile telephony services TSTT. However, as of 2015 TSTT and Digicel remain the only mobile providers. 
Internet connectivity has seen the participation of much more players than mobile telephone with the presence of five broadband service providers/ISPs.

Energy sector
Trinidad and Tobago has been involved in the petroleum sector for over one hundred years. There has been considerable oil and gas production on land and in shallow water, with cumulative production totaling over three billion barrels of oil. Trinidad and Tobago is the largest oil and natural gas producer in the Caribbean. In the 1990s, the hydrocarbon sector moved from producing mainly oil to producing mostly natural gas. According to the EIA, in 2013, proven crude oil reserves were estimated at 728 million barrels, while 3P natural gas reserves were 25.24 trillion cubic feet (Tcf) (Ryder Scott Audit 2012).

Trinidad and Tobago houses one of the largest natural gas processing facilities in the Western Hemisphere. The Phoenix Park Gas Processors Limited (PPGPL) natural gas liquids (NGL) complex is located in the Port of Savonetta. It has a processing capacity of almost 2 billion cubic feet (Bcf) per day and an output capacity of 70,000 barrels per day (bbl/d) of NGL. After processing the gas is then transferred to the various power generators (POWERGEN, TGU, or Trinity Power) for generation of electricity and to the petrochemical plants for use as a feedstock.

The electricity sector is fueled entirely by natural gas. Trinidad Generation Unlimited power plant, the second combined cycle plant in the country, with a generating capacity of 720MW, was opened on 31 October 2013.
 
With 11 ammonia plants and seven methanol plants, Trinidad and Tobago was the world's largest exporter of ammonia and the second largest exporter of methanol in 2013, according to IHS Global Insight. Overall production and export for ammonia, methanol, urea, and UAN decreased to 428,240 metric monnes (MT) in 2013 from 564,892 MT in 2012.

The Ministry of Energy and Energy Affairs (MEEA) has encouraged investment in projects for "downstream" processing of petrochemicals, such as the manufacture of calcium chloride and dimethyl ether (DME). Such projects are expected to generate more local employment and more growth in local manufacturing than traditional petrochemical processing.

The energy sector accounts for around 45.0% of the country's GDP. The Central Bank predicted real GDP growth in Trinidad and Tobago of 2.6% in 2014, up from 1.6% in 2013, as the country's energy sector recovered from maintenance delays that reduced activity in the third quarter of 2013.

MEEA predicted that production of liquefied natural gas (LNG) would rise by 2.0% to 40.0bcm in 2014, following an estimated 1.5% drop in production in 2013. Production of petrochemicals was also expected to rebound, following an 8.0% drop in output in the third quarter of 2013, as several companies aligned their production schedules with the natural gas shortfall.

Job market
In addition the thriving energy sector, the nation controls 0.25% of the world's natural gas with a GDP of twenty billion US dollars (US$20.5b). These factors are quintessential in driving the demand for quality labor, especially in specialized area as it pertains to the energy sector. Such area of specialisation are for the first time in history being sought after in this little nation, but requires the expertise of expats to fill. According to former Prime Minister Patrick Manning, the nation is the financial capital of the Caribbean, and being so heavily reliant on the oil and energy sectors, fosters and facilitates an environment of constant demand for specialized jobs. In addition, the Natural Gas sector is for the first time facing competition from countries such as Qatar and the United States. All these factors are stimulating the need to produce local specialists as the demand increases. There are also clear indications that the nation is at the end of an economic downturn and poised for a period of economic boom.

A wealth of jobs would be created in the short run to feed a diversity of economic demands across all sectors of the economy. Finance minister Winston Dookeran unveiled the largest budget (TT$54b) in the history of the nation in October 2011, reiterating the government's resolve to transform the economy, which will boost investor confidence in the nation. This process of transformation will create a hosts of jobs and numerous foreign investor opportunities. The proverbial wheels of the economy are being oiled the economy and other areas of the economy such as the Financial and Manufacturing Sectors will benefit tremendously from the spin offs.

Government ministers have already made plans to facilitate viable tools in assisting with the roll out. Within the past couple years government agencies have begun to utilize recruitment tools such as agencies and job boards. The government has recognized the usefulness in sourcing and outsourcing labor from different areas. Recruitment on the whole in Trinidad and Tobago have experienced huge strides, from the traditional snail mail to company's emails and job boards. Local experts have mentioned that moving forward in such a small area is a big tool to in executing and rolling out macro plans smoothly.

Tourism
Tourism is another area which it is believed will soon develop rapidly, and an increased demand for jobs. The European Union Council on Tourism and Trade (EUCTT) has also awarded the nation as being "The Best Tourist Destination for 2012". Local hotels have already begun to make plans to facilitate an influx of European tourists upon the nation receiving this designation. However, the EUCTT is not affiliated with any part of the European Union's Institutions. Despite concerns over the global economy, international tourism demand continues to show resilience. The 
number of international tourists worldwide grew by 5% (22 million) between January and June 2012, with Asia and 
the Pacific (+8%) leading the growth among the regions. Given this growth rate a total of one billion international 
tourists are expected by the end of 2012. In 2011, the total contribution of World Travel & Tourism to global GDP 
was US$6,346.1bn (9.1% of GDP). 
In 2011, the Caribbean region received 20.9 million tourists, a growth of 4.4% over the same period in 2010. The 
Caribbean is the most dependent region on tourism with Travel and Tourism contributing 13.9% (US$47.1bn) to its 
economic output. Trinidad and Tobago received an estimated 402,058 visitors in 2011, representing 2% of all 
Caribbean visitor arrivals. 
Due to the multifaceted nature of tourism, its economic impact is not confined to any single industry. To 
adequately measure the economic impact of the tourism sector, the United Nations World Travel and Tourism 
Council (UNWTO) devised the Tourism Satellite Account (TSA), an extension of the System of National Accounts 
(SNA). The TSA is a detailed production account of the tourism sector showing its linkages to major industries, 
total employment, capital formation and additional macro-economic variables.

Tourist arrival statistics

Most visitors arriving to Trinidad and Tobago on short-term basis in 2014 were from the following countries of nationality:

Creative industries

Recently, the country's economy has been negatively affected by fluctuating oil and gas prices and in an effort to undergo economic transformation through diversification, the government has identified the creative industries, particularly the music, film and fashion sectors, as pivotal to long-term economic sustainability. As such, the Trinidad and Tobago Creative Industries Company Limited (CreativeTT) was established in 2013 to oversee the strategic and business development of the three niche areas of film, fashion and music.

Miscellaneous
Economic aid – recipient:
$200,000 (2007 est.)

Reserves of foreign exchange and gold:
$8.095 billion (February 2018 est.)

Currency:
1 Trinidad and Tobago dollar (TT$) = 100 cents

Exchange rates:
Trinidad and Tobago dollars (TT$) per US$1 :

6.7283 (2017)
6.6152 (2016)
6.3298 (2015)
6.3613 (2014)
6.3885 (2013)
6.3716 (2012)
6.4200 (2011 est)
6.3337 (2010)
6.3099 (2009)
6.2896 (2008)
6.3275 (2007)
6.3107 (2006)
6.2842 (2005),
6.2990 (2004),
6.2951 (2003),
6.2487 (2002),
6.2332 (2001),
6.2697 (2000),
6.2963 (1999),
6.2983 (1998),
6.2517 (1997),
6.0051 (1996),
5.9478 (1995)

Stock of direct foreign investment – at home:
$12.44 billion (2007)

Stock of direct foreign investment – abroad:
$1.419 billion (2007)

Market value of publicly traded shares:
$15.57 billion (2006)

Fiscal year:
1 October – 30 September

See also

 Economy of the Caribbean
 Economy of South America
 Asphalt industry in Trinidad
 Trinidad and Tobago dollar
 Central Bank of Trinidad and Tobago
 Central banks and currencies of the Caribbean
 List of companies of Trinidad and Tobago
 Trinidad and Tobago Stock Exchange
 List of countries by leading trade partners
 List of countries by credit rating
 List of countries by public debt
 List of Commonwealth of Nations countries by GDP
 List of Latin American and Caribbean countries by GDP growth
 List of Latin American and Caribbean countries by GDP (nominal)
 List of Latin American and Caribbean countries by GDP (PPP)
 List of countries by tax revenue as percentage of GDP
 List of countries by future gross government debt

References

External links
World Bank Summary Trade Statistics Trinidad and Tobago

 
Trinidad and Tobago